The Ambassador of the United Kingdom to Brazil is the United Kingdom's foremost diplomatic representative in Brazil and the head of the UK's diplomatic mission in Brazil.  The official title is His Britannic Majesty's Ambassador to the Federative Republic of Brazil.

Besides the embassy and consulate-general in Brasilia, the UK government is represented by consulates-general in São Paulo, Rio de Janeiro, Recife, and Belo Horizonte.

List of heads of mission

Envoy Extraordinary and Minister Plenipotentiary to the Emperor of Brazil 

 1826: Sir Henry Chamberlain, 1st Baronet, consul general and chargé
 1826–1828: Sir Robert Gordon
 1828–1832: John, Lord Ponsonby
 1828: Percy, Viscount Strangford, special mission
 1832–1835: Stephen Henry Fox
 1835–1838: Hamilton Charles James Hamilton
 1838–1847: William Gore Ouseley, chargé
 1842: Henry Ellis, extraordinary and special mission
 1847–1850: The Lord Howden
 1850–1851: James Hudson
 1851–1853: Henry Southern
 1853–1855: Henry Francis Howard
 1855–1858: Peter Campbell Scarlett
 1859–1863: William Dougal Christie
 1865–1867: Sir Edward Thornton
 1867–1879: George Buckley-Mathew
 1879–1881: Clare Ford
 1881–1885: Edwin Corbett
 1885–1888: Hugh MacDonell
 1888–1891: Hugh Wyndham

Envoy Extraordinary and Minister Plenipotentiary to the United States of Brazil
1891–1894: Hugh Wyndham (later Sir Hugh Wyndham)
1894–1900: Constantine Phipps (later Sir Constantine Phipps)
1900–1906: Sir Henry Dering, 9th Bt.
1906–1915: Sir William Henry Doveton Haggard
1915–1919: Sir Arthur Peel

Ambassador
1919–1921: Sir Ralph Paget
1921–1925: Sir John Tilley
1925–1930: Sir Beilby Alston
1930–1935: Sir William Seeds
1935–1939: Sir Hugh Gurney
1939–1941: Sir Geoffrey Knox
1941–1944: Sir Noel Charles
1944–1947: Sir Donald Gainer
1947–1952: Sir Nevile Butler
1952–1956: Sir Geoffrey Thompson
1956–1958: Sir Geoffrey Harrison
1958–1963: Sir Geoffrey Wallinger
1963–1966: Sir Leslie Fry
1966–1969: Sir John Russell
1969–1973: Sir David Hunt
1973–1977: Sir Derek Dodson 
1977–1979: Sir Norman Statham
1979–1981: George Edmund Hall
1981–1984: William Harding (later Sir William Harding)
1984–1987: John Ure (later Sir John Ure)
1987–1992: Michael Newington
1992–1995: Peter Heap (later Sir Peter Heap)
1995–1999: Donald Haskell
1999–2004: Sir Roger Bone
2004–2008: Peter Collecott
2008–2013: Alan Charlton
2013–2017: Alex Ellis
2017–2020: Vijay Rangarajan
2021–2022: Peter Wilson

2022–: Melanie Hopkins (acting)

See also
 Brazil–United Kingdom relations

References

External links
UK and Brazil, gov.uk
Previous Ambassadors (up to 2008), British Embassy Brasilia

Brazil
 
United Kingdom ambassadors